Jamestown Public Schools may refer to:
 Jamestown Public Schools (New York)
 Jamestown Public Schools (North Dakota)